Tidens Krav (TK) English: The Time's Demands is a local newspaper published in Kristiansund, Norway. It was founded in 1906, is published Tuesday through Saturday, and reports news from Nordmøre. 

The newspaper owned the local television station TKTV (previously TV Nordvest), before it was discontinued in November 2018.

Circulation
Circulation numbers verified by the Norwegian Media Businesses' Association:
 2006: 15 150
 2007: 15 412
 2008: 15 281
 2009: 14 900
 2010: 14 605

References

Daily newspapers published in Norway
Companies based in Kristiansund
Newspapers established in 1906
1906 establishments in Norway
Amedia